Emilio Villegas (born 23 September 1968) is a Dominican Republic boxer. He competed in the men's featherweight event at the 1988 Summer Olympics, losing to Paul Fitzgerald of Ireland. He also won a silver medal in the featherweight event at the 1987 Pan American Games.

References

External links
 

1968 births
Living people
Dominican Republic male boxers
Olympic boxers of the Dominican Republic
Boxers at the 1988 Summer Olympics
Place of birth missing (living people)
Pan American Games medalists in boxing
Pan American Games silver medalists for the Dominican Republic
Boxers at the 1987 Pan American Games
Featherweight boxers
Medalists at the 1987 Pan American Games
20th-century Dominican Republic people
21st-century Dominican Republic people